The 2015 Mitas Slovenian FIM Speedway Grand Prix was the ninth race of the 2015 Speedway Grand Prix season. It took place on September 12 at the Matija Gubec Stadium in Krško, Slovenia.

Riders 
First reserve Peter Kildemand replaced Jarosław Hampel, who had injured himself during the 2015 Speedway World Cup. The Speedway Grand Prix Commission also nominated Aleksander Čonda as the wild card, and Denis Štojs and Žiga Kovačič both as Track Reserves.

Results 
The Grand Prix was won by Greg Hancock, who beat Tai Woffinden, Peter Kildemand and Nicki Pedersen in the final. Hancock only dropped one point in the entire meeting, finishing to Jason Doyle in heat 18. Overall, Woffinden extended his lead in the world title race to 25 points, with Hancock leapfrogging Pedersen into second place.

Heat details

The intermediate classification

References

See also 
 motorcycle speedway

2015 Speedway Grand Prix
2015 in Slovenian sport
Speedway Grand Prix of Slovenia